John Riley Boling (November 19, 1895 Bloomfield, Texas – June 28, 1962 Tulsa, Oklahoma) was an American racecar driver of direct Native American ancestry, the first Native American to race in the Indianapolis 500. Boling is buried in an unmarked grave at Oaklawn Cemetery in Tulsa, Oklahoma.

Indy 500 results

References

Indianapolis 500 drivers
1895 births
1962 deaths
Racing drivers from Texas